( or  "roofing stone") were a means of covering burial chambers and burial mounds during the kofun period of Japan.  Stones collected from riverbeds were affixed to the slopes of raised kofun and other burial chambers.  They are considered to have descended from forms used in Yayoi-period tumuli.  They are common in the early and mid-Kofun periods, but most late Kofun-period tumuli do not have them.

Origin and ancestry

Tombs covered with fukiishi appear sporadically in Western Japan from the mid-Yayoi period and continue into the Kofun period.

The burial mound at the  archaeological site in the city of Sōja in Okayama Prefecture is surrounded with rows of stones; such examples are widely seen in the San'in and the nearby San'yō regions, where examples of burial mounds demarcated by stacks of stone walls are also seen.

Terminology

The term  came into use as an archaeological term largely due to the influence of  book  ("Kofun and ancient culture", 1922).  Via examples of kofun in the Kinai capital region Takashi described the  there as serving both practical and decorative purposes: in practical terms the use of pebbles provided protection from the wind, rain, and cold, while the stones served to beautify the mound which was after all built above ground to attract public attention and to impress and rouse piety in visiting worshippers.

Research

Excavation of fukiishi themselves was nearly nonexistent before World War II.  It was only after the war that scientific examination, verification, and surveying of the stones took place.

The group surveyed three quarters of the kofun, with a height of 10 m and a diameter of 60 m. The report published in 1960 gave the extent of distribution, shape and size, petrological analysis, technical analysis of the roofing method, and minute illustration the configuration of the individual stones. The report estimated the number of stones at about 80,000.

In response to the rapid increase in the post-war period of large-scale development that led to in the destruction of historical ruins, urgent excavations were carried out with the goal of thorough examination rather than as the preservation of documentation.  As a result of this early research, Shōzō Haraguchi and  published a paper in 1967 on the excavation of tumulus C1 of the Bentenyama kofungun group in Takatsuki in Osaka.  The paper notes the results of investigation into the stacking methods, the weight and number of stones per unit area, the collection areas and transportation routes of the stones, and other details.   stated that following this report hardly any other resulting from such an accumulation of verifiable details on fukiishi has appeared.

Research into fukiishi has come to require knowledge related to construction technology.  To enable the scientific qualification and quantification of research documentation, Hisanori Ishizuka has called for research on:

 Palaeoecology
 Soil mechanics
 Structural engineering
 Materials
 Fukiishi construction
 Structural masonry

Materials and construction methods

The material for fukiishi was often made up of pebbles and stones from dry riverbeds.  In the case of pebbles, a variety of stones was used.  For example, the late-4th-century  in Kashiwara in Osaka Prefecture was made with andesite flagstones in vertical or sloped piles.  Other sites used chert, sandstone, slate, basalt, or other types of stone.

Embankments were often made with soil transported from other areas. Pollen analysis of the fifth- and sixth-century kofuns of the Kuboizumi-Maruyama Historic Sites in Saga has shown clear disparities in the vegetation in the soil of the mound faces and that of the surrounding environment.  This example suggests that the borrow pits for the construction of the mounds were in remote locations.

Stone Building Methods 

Among different methods of stone tomb construction, it was found that there are four different classifications of burial mound structures.

Type 1 

These buildings include a stacked stone wall with thick backfill and lack a base stone in the construction. The typical examples of burials in this style are Nakayama Otsuka Kofun (Nara Prefecture Tenri City), Hokeno Mountain Burial Mound (Sakurai City, Nara Prefecture), and in the rear section of the former Inari Tomaru, Kyoto, these are the oldest structures still present in Yamato.

Type 2 
This construction method is characterized by the dual-staged stacking of the stone base. The basal stone is stacked horizontally and the subsequent masonry is stacked on top. These mounds tend to exhibit steep inclines of 30 degrees or more. Prime examples of this type of burial mound are found in Red Tsuchiyama Tumulus in the Tenri City of Nara Prefecture and Xizhiduka Mound and the Miwa Mountain Burial Mound 1 in Tsuyama City Okayama Prefecture.

Class 3-1 
"Stacking Stone" is the classification of this type of stone, the basement stones are overlapped with the main body of the structure. The Benten Mountain Mound (C1) in Takatsuki City, Osaka Prefecture is a representative example of this style of mound building.

Class 3-2 
This type of burial mound does not stack stone layers over the foundation. Instead, the stones are embedded in the soil in a method referred to as "pasting stones".

Class 3-3 
Construction technology changes as current methods fuse with local methods. Examples of this can be found in Kashiwabara City at Mt Tama 1 and Tama 7 (Tamane Mountain Burial Mounds).

Class 4 
This method of construction follows the "paste stone" method in Class 3-2. Mounds generally displays shallow inclines of 20-25 degrees. The mounds consist mostly of small stones with gravel filled gaps; which is generally found in the Saki Gouzanyama Kofun (Saki Gouran Mountain Burial Mound) in Nara City, Nara Prefecture.

Purpose and function

As they were used primarily on slopes and rarely on flat surfaces it is also thought they may have served to prevent runoff, and may have contributed to waterproofing and drainage. They may also have been used to imply the mound was sacred, holy ground and clearly differentiate it from adjacent areas. Archaeologist  notes the use of  may be related to a desire to make royalty visible and exhibit the people's connection with royalty, a feature he sees as characteristic of Japanese burial mounds in comparison with those of other Asian countries, and in particular in the case of keyhole-shaped kofun.

Demise

The scale of kofun construction peaked in the middle of the Kofun period in the mid-5th century, reflecting the power and influence of the political structure and the social status of the entombed via the form and scale of the tumuli.  Towards the close of the 5th century, the construction of large keyhole-shaped kofun and groups of layered kofun waned.

At the beginning of the 6th century, the scale of most keyhole-shaped kofun west from the Kantō region became smaller, the smaller  ("satellite") tumuli began to disappear, and fukiishi began to be used infrequently.  Three-tiered kofun saw a strong decrease in favour of two-tiered ones.  Outside of the Kantō region, haniwa stopped being used.  From the end of the 6th century to the beginning of the 7th, the tumuli of the monarchs changed from square hōfun tumuli to octagonal  tumuli.  Amongst these,  dome-shaped grave mounds made with fukiishi, such as Musashi Fuchū Kumano Jinja Kofun in Fuchū in Tokyo, are noteworthy.  Nevertheless, during this era kofun were quickly ceding the role of central ritual building to Buddhist temples, and the adoption of rammed earth construction techniques stands out.

Aoki has pointed out that this was modeled on the decoration techniques of the foundations of Buddhist temples.

Kofun restoration

Gallery

Notes

References

Works cited

External links
 
 Goshikizuka and Ōtoshiyama Kofun website (in Japanese)
 Kofun Moody's (in Japanese)

Archaeology of death
Japanese architectural history
Kofun
Kofun period
Mounds